Junker Jørgensen (17 May 1946 – 8 January 1989) was a Danish cyclist. He competed in the team time trial at the 1972 Summer Olympics.

References

External links
 

1946 births
1989 deaths
Danish male cyclists
Olympic cyclists of Denmark
Cyclists at the 1972 Summer Olympics
People from Roskilde
Sportspeople from Region Zealand